Octavio Mora (born 28 November 1965) is a Mexican former footballer who played at both professional and international levels as a striker.

Career
Born in Guadalajara, Mora played professionally for Universidad de Guadalajara, Cruz Azul and Monterrey.

He also represented Mexico at international level, earning a total of 13 caps.

After he retired from playing, Mora became a football coach. He managed Querétaro F.C. during 2003.

Personal
Mora's son, Jorge, is also a professional footballer.

References

External links

1965 births
Living people
Mexican footballers
Mexico international footballers
Liga MX players
Leones Negros UdeG footballers
Cruz Azul footballers
C.F. Monterrey players
Mexican football managers
Querétaro F.C. managers
CONCACAF Gold Cup-winning players
Footballers from Guadalajara, Jalisco
Association football forwards
1993 CONCACAF Gold Cup players